Fatih Şentürk is a Turkish amputee footballer who plays as a midfielder.

Career

Şentürk helped Turkey win the 2022 Amputee Football World Cup, their only World Cup win.

References

Living people
Turkey international amputee football players
Turkish amputees
Year of birth missing (living people)